Saanich—Gulf Islands is a federal electoral district in British Columbia, Canada, that has been represented in the House of Commons of Canada since 1988. It is named for its geographical location across the Gulf Islands and Saanich Peninsula in the Vancouver Island region.

Demographics

More than 21 percent of Saanich—Gulf Islands' residents are immigrants, and more than 19 percent are older than 65, making this the riding with the third largest senior population in Canada. The riding has a median age of 48.3, making it the riding with the highest median age in Canada. The average family income is $70,814; unemployment is 5.9 percent.

According to the Canada 2016 Census; 2013 representation

Languages: 83.8% English, 2.3% Mandarin, 2.1% Cantonese, 1.5% German, 1.5% French, 1.2% Punjabi
Religions (2011): 46.9% Christian (12.2% Catholic, 10.6% Anglican, 7.8% United Church, 2.2% Baptist, 1.7% Lutheran, 1.5% Presbyterian, 1.1%% Pentecostal, 10.0% Other), 1.3% Buddhist, 1.2% Sikh, 47.3% No religion 
Median income (2015): $37,376 
Average income (2015): $49,898

Geography
The riding of Saanich—Gulf Islands consists of the north part of the Municipality of Saanich, as well as the municipalities of Central Saanich, North Saanich, and Sidney on Vancouver Island. The district also includes a number of the southern Gulf Islands, including Salt Spring Island, the Pender Islands, Galiano Island, Mayne Island and Saturna Island. The district's southeastern border runs along the University of Victoria.

History
The electoral district was created in 1987 from Esquimalt—Saanich and Cowichan—Malahat—The Islands ridings.

The 2012 federal electoral boundaries redistribution concluded that the electoral boundaries of Saanich—Gulf Islands should be adjusted, and a modified electoral district of the same name will be contested in future elections. The redefined Saanich—Gulf Islands loses a small portion of its current territory in the urbanized portion of Saanich to the new district of Esquimalt—Saanich—Sooke. These new boundaries were legally defined in the 2013 representation order, which came into effect upon the call of the 42nd Canadian federal election, which was held 19 October 2015.

Political geography
Despite the usually close vote between the various right-leaning parties, the Canadian Alliance, Reform and Conservative parties have consistently won here from 1993 to 2011. Since 1953, the riding and its predecessor, Esquimalt—Saanich, have only gone to a non-conservative candidate five times: 1968 to Liberal David Anderson, in 1988 to New Democrat Lynn Hunter, and in 2011, 2015 and 2019 to Green party leader Elizabeth May, who in 2015 won every poll-district within the constituency. The 1988 Conservative loss is attributed to vote splitting between the Progressive Conservatives and the new Reform party. Despite a Conservative majority in 2011, the Greens won their very first elected seat here, and has since become their only stronghold in the country. The peninsular portion of the riding is more competitive, with significant support for all parties except the Liberals. However, the Gulf Isalnds have probably the strongest Green support in the country, with many voters being environmentally conscious, moderate retirees, as well as a notable artist population. This, combined with a very popular MP in Former leader Elizabeth May, Saanich Gulf Islands becoming the safest Green riding. Even with the Green collapse nationally in 2021, May held on with 37%, although it was her lowest voteshare in the riding.

Riding associations

Riding associations are the local branches of political parties:

Members of Parliament

This riding has elected the following Members of Parliament:

Current Member of Parliament
Its Member of Parliament is current and former Green Party leader Elizabeth May. She was first elected in 2011 and is the first Green MP to be elected to the House of Commons. She defeated Conservative Incumbent and cabinet minister Gary Lunn.

Election results

See also
 List of Canadian federal electoral districts
 Past Canadian electoral districts

References

Library of Parliament Riding Profile 1987–1996
Library of Parliament Riding Profile 1996–2005
 Expenditures – 2004
 Expenditures – 2000
 Expenditures – 1997

Notes

External links
 Website of the Parliament of Canada
 Website of the Conservative Party in Saanich Gulf Islands
 Website of the Green Party
 Website of the Liberal Party of Canada in Saanich Gulf Islands
 Website of the New Democratic Party (NDP) in Saanich Gulf Islands

British Columbia federal electoral districts
British Columbia federal electoral districts on Vancouver Island
Saanich, British Columbia